Cathal O'Byrne (1867 – 1 August 1957) was an Irish singer, poet and writer.

Early life
O'Byrne was born and raised at Balmoral County Down, the son of parents from County Wicklow. He was employed at a grocery on Beersbridge Road in Ballymacarret where he would befriend Joseph Devlin. He settled in the Falls Road area of Belfast where he lived with his sister in a house at 43 Cavendish Street. In 2004, the Ulster History Circle placed a blue plaque on this house in his memory.

Career
He joined the Gaelic League in Belfast and became a popular singer and storyteller. He was a stage manager of the Ulster Theater and would even become involved with the IRA, likely a member of military council. In 1921 O'Byrne traveled to America as a freelance journalist and opened a bookstore. He would return to Ireland after raising $100,000 for victims of the Belfast riots through White Cross. He was a devout Catholic, and even interviewed the Pope. Known for his dandified dress style, Cathal remained a bachelor his entire life. O'Byrne suffered from a stroke one month before his death on 1 August 1957. He is remembered as an important figure in the Celtic revival in Northern Ireland.

His most famous book is entitled As I Roved Out: A Book of the North.

O'Byrne's poem "A lullaby" from " Lane o' the Thrushes" was set to words by an Irish composer of the same time, Hamilton Harty, in his "Six Songs of Ireland".

Published works
The Grey Feet of the Wind (1917)
From Far Green Hills (1935)
The Burthen and the Returned Swank(1940)
As I Roved Out: A Book of the North (1946)
Ashes on the Hearth (1948)
Pilgrim in Italy (1949)

References

External links
 
 
 O'Byrne at Ulster History Circle

1867 births
1957 deaths
Musicians from Belfast
Irish songwriters
Irish dramatists and playwrights
Irish male dramatists and playwrights
Irish poets
Irish journalists
Roman Catholic writers